Aleksandr Ivanovich Timoshinin (20 May 1948 – 26 November 2021) was a Russian rower, born in Moscow, who competed for the Soviet Union in the 1968 Summer Olympics and in the 1972 Summer Olympics.

In 1968 he and his partner Anatoliy Sass won the gold medal in the double sculls event.

Four years later he won his second gold medal this time with his partner Gennadi Korshikov in the double sculls competition.

Timoshinin died on 26 November 2021, at the age of 73.

References

External links
 
 

1948 births
2021 deaths
Rowers from Moscow
Russian male rowers
Soviet male rowers
Olympic rowers of the Soviet Union
Rowers at the 1968 Summer Olympics
Rowers at the 1972 Summer Olympics
Olympic gold medalists for the Soviet Union
Olympic medalists in rowing
Medalists at the 1972 Summer Olympics
Medalists at the 1968 Summer Olympics
European Rowing Championships medalists
Russian State University of Physical Education, Sport, Youth and Tourism alumni